The Ramal Talca-Constitución, also known as the Ramal de Maule is the last remaining narrow-gauge ramal (branch line) in Chile. Its  route follows the north bank of the Maule River and crosses the communes of Talca, Maule, Pencahue and Constitución, with Constitución the last station on the line. The route features views of the Andean foothills and the Pacific Ocean. The line can support a speed of 50 miles per hour (80 km/h). The railway is facing closure due to inactivity and an increased preference for private transport.

Chile's last passenger metre gauge railway, the ramal runs through an area not served by other ground transportation. The Banco de Arena Railway Bridge over the Maule River, designed by architect Gustave Eiffel, was built from 1908 and 1915 by Schneider and Company. On May 25, 2007 the line was declared a national monument, a valued asset to the country which cannot be destroyed. It is included on the World Monuments Fund's 2018 list of monuments at risk, following damage from forest fires.

History

Rail transport came to the Maule Region when the North and South American Company began construction in 1889. The line opened on August 13, 1892, and the first train ran from Talca to Curtiduría (another commune in Chile). The second segment of the line, from Curtiduria to Pichamán (another commune) was completed on November 1, 1894. In 1902 construction progressed towards the northern bank of the Maule River, where the first Constitución station was built on a sandbank. The station was difficult to reach; passengers crossed the river from the city, and a convoy brought them to the Constitución station. It was used for 13 years, until 1915 (when the present Constitución station opened).

Construction of the line took almost 25 years, under seven governments: 
 Jose Manuel Balmaceda (1886-1891)
 Jorge Montt Alvarez (1891-1896)
 Federico Errazuriz Echaurren (1896-1901)
 Germán Riesco (1901-1906)
 Pedro Montt Montt (1906-1910)
 Emiliano Figueroa (September–December 1910)
 Ramon Barros Luco (1910-1915)
 Juan Luis Sanfuentes (opened on December 19, 1915)

The line had an uptick in tourism boom after the documentary, The Last Ramal, which was aired by several channels around the world. Televisión Nacional de Chile broadcast a December 2005 report, Fruit of the Country.

Old route 
The line originally followed the coast in Constitución to the now-abandoned Sea Baths, a popular Victorian-era tourist resort. Another stop was later added before the Celulosa Arauco y Constitucion (Celco) pulp-mill station. To reach the Celco plant, the trains ran through the streets of Constitución. This created many problems and was banned by the municipality during the early 1970s, although the trains continued to run into the 1990s.

Specifications
  Name - Ramal Talca-Constitución or Ramal de Maule
  Home station - Talca 
  Terminus - Constitución 
  Location - Talca Province, Maule Region
  Distance - 88 km
  Opening date - 
  Status - Operating 
  Type - Passenger
  Operator - Empresa de los Ferrocarriles del Estado
  Gauge - Narrow (1000 mm)
  Fuel - Diesel (formerly steam)
  Cars - German Ferrobús-Buscarril railcar models, such as the ADM 253, 255 and 256
  Maximum speed - 60 km/h
  Weight - 30.3 tons
  Length -

Dependent communities

The Ministry of Transport and Telecommunications requested tenders for a transportation system which could connect these remote locations, and Empresa de los Ferrocarriles del Estado won the tender. The company maintains a regular service for the thousands of local inhabitants; locals have priority on the line over tourists or other users.

Route 

Distances below (in kilometers) are approximate.

González Bastías station 

González Bastías is a small town which, at 44 km, is the line's halfway point. It is an obligatory stop for trains in both directions, since there is only one track and they must pass each other. During the stop-over, people often buy rescoldo: a hearty bread with pork sausage and hard-boiled eggs. The station is also a storehouse for abandoned railcars.

González Bastías was formerly known as Infiernillo (little hell) for its summer heat and winter isolation. The town was later renamed in honor of a local poet, and the station is also known as Estación Poeta.

2010 earthquake

The line was severely damaged by the 2010 8.8-magnitude earthquake. The quake's ensuing tsunami destroyed the Constitución station. National media reported that ghost towns sprang up whilst the line was out of service because the towns served by the line are dependent on it. In a normal year, 90,000 people use the line to travel to local towns for work, leisure or commerce. After nine months out of service it was reopened by president Sebastián Piñera, who fulfilled an election promise. Despite the earthquake and tsunami damage, the ramal was repaired relatively quickly.

References

Railway lines in Chile